Ameristar Charters Flight 9363 was an air charter flight from Willow Run Airport in Ypsilanti, Michigan to Dulles International Airport in Dulles, Virginia, which experienced a rejected takeoff and runway excursion on March 8, 2017 as the result of a jammed elevator; the McDonnell Douglas MD-83 operating the flight was substantially damaged, but only one injury and no fatalities occurred to the 116 crew and passengers on board.

Accident

The aircraft had been chartered to transport the Michigan Wolverines men's basketball team to the Big Ten tournament in Washington, D.C. for the following day's game against the Illinois Fighting Illini.  Prior to the attempted flight, the aircraft had been parked at Willow Run Airport since arriving early in the morning of March 6 at the end of a flight from Lincoln Airport in Lincoln, Nebraska, during which no reported flight control anomalies had occurred.

More than two and a half hours prior to the accident, the air traffic control tower at Willow Run Airport had been evacuated due to high winds; the winds had also caused a power failure which rendered inoperative most of the weather instrumentation of the airport's automated surface observing system.  As a result, the flightcrew of Flight 9363 obtained weather information from alternate sources, contacting company operations personnel for a temperature setting, calling Detroit Metropolitan Airport on one of the pilots' cell phones to get the current weather information at the latter airport, and using a windsock to determine the predominant wind direction (and, thereby, the best runway to use for takeoff).

The flight taxied uneventfully (apart from a delay in successfully filing and activating a flight plan, due in part to the power outage at Willow Run) to runway 23L, and, at 14:51:12 Eastern Standard Time, with the flightcrew having finished all preflight checks and obtained a takeoff clearance from Detroit Metropolitan (again via cell phone), the check airman acting as pilot in command directed the captain to begin the takeoff roll. The takeoff roll was normal until rotation speed (VR), at  indicated airspeed (KIAS). At VR, when the captain pulled back on the control column to rotate the aircraft, the aircraft failed to respond, even after the captain applied additional back force to the control column. Judging the aircraft to be incapable of flight, the captain performed a rejected takeoff, immediately applying maximum braking followed by spoilers and reverse thrust. Upon striking the road pavement, the aircraft's landing gear collapsed, and the aircraft slid on its belly over the road and a ditch just beyond (causing substantial damage to the belly and underside of the nose), coming to a stop with its empennage on the road and its nose in a grassy field on the far side of the road and ditch. An orderly, rapid evacuation followed, with only one (relatively minor) injury occurring.

Investigation

The failure of the aircraft to rotate, despite even a greater-than-normal nose-up control column input, focused suspicion on the aircraft's elevator system.  The MD-80 (in common with all other DC-9s except for the MD-90) uses a tab-driven elevator, with the pilots' control columns connected via cables to servo tabs on the trailing edges of the inboard elevators.  When a nose-up control input is commanded by the pilots, the elevator control tabs deflect in the trailing-edge-down direction, creating an upwards aerodynamic force on the elevators which causes them to deflect in the trailing-edge-up direction.  Two geared tabs, one per elevator, are located outboard of the control tabs; these are mechanically connected to the elevators, and deflect in the direction opposite that of the elevators, producing additional aerodynamic force to help move the elevators.

When the aircraft was inspected on site following the accident, the right elevator was found to be jammed in a trailing-edge-down (TED) position slightly beyond its normal limit of motion, and could not be moved by hand.  The inboard control linkage of the right elevator's geared tab was damaged, being locked in an overcenter position, beyond its normal limit of travel, and with portions of the control linkage bent and displaced outboard; when the damaged linkage was disconnected by investigators, the elevator could be freely moved by hand from stop to stop.  The cockpit controls could be moved throughout their full range of motion, and the control tabs were observed to move properly in response to control-column inputs; as the elevators are not mechanically connected to the cockpit controls, the jammed right elevator would not have altered the feel of the control column, preventing the elevator jam from becoming apparent to the flight crew prior to their attempting to rotate the aircraft.  Due to the MD-80's T-tailed design, which places the horizontal stabilizers and elevators atop the vertical stabilizer, the elevators are about 30 feet above the ground when the aircraft is on its wheels, making it impractical to directly check whether the elevators can move (which would require someone to raise themself up to the horizontal tail, using a lift or similar equipment, and then attempt to physically move the elevator surfaces), and such a check is not routinely performed on the MD-80 during preflight inspection unless there is reason to suspect damage to a particular aircraft's elevator system.

A review of elevator-position data from the aircraft's flight data recorder (FDR) showed that the last time the right elevator was recorded as not being in the full-TED position was on the morning of March 6, over two days previously, when the aircraft's electrical system was briefly powered up during a maintenance check several hours after arriving from Lincoln.  By the next time the aircraft was powered up (at 1238 on the day of the accident), the right elevator was already at the full-TED position, and remained there in all elevator-position data recorded during the preparations for the flight to Dulles; in contrast, the left elevator moved several times throughout its full range of motion under the influence of ground winds.  During the attempted takeoff, the left elevator followed the captain's control-column inputs; in contrast, the right elevator remained in the full-TED position until partway through the attempted rotation, and, even then, moved only slightly upwards, not enough to allow the aircraft to rotate.  Due to the aircraft's inability to rotate during takeoff, the NTSB concluded that the captain was justified in rejecting the takeoff despite being well past V1 (normally the point beyond which a takeoff should not be rejected unless, as occurred here, there is reason to consider the aircraft incapable of flight) and at too high a speed for the aircraft to have been stopped on the runway, as the elevator jam could not reasonably have been detected prior to this point.

While the aircraft was parked at Willow Run, it had been exposed to the high, gusting winds affecting the airport. Wind of sufficient strength coming from directions other than straight ahead can cause damage to an aircraft's flight control system. Had the winds affecting the airport been forecast to exceed 60 knots during the time the aircraft was on the ground there, the aircraft maintenance manual (AMM) for the aircraft would have required it to be parked facing into the forecast wind direction; if the aircraft had been exposed to wind gusts in excess of 65 knots from other than straight ahead while parked, a physical inspection of all its flight control surfaces would have been required, including a check confirming that the control surfaces were free to move.

Prior elevator jam incident (Munich, 1999)

Prior to the Flight 9363 accident, Boeing, and Douglas and McDonnell Douglas before them, had record of only one wind-induced elevator jam on any DC-9-series aircraft, which occurred at Munich Airport, Germany, in December 1999, and involved exposure to winds exceeding the elevator system's design limits.

A full inspection of the aircraft's elevators (which would have included attempting to move the elevator surfaces by hand to confirm freedom of movement) was not conducted, due to personnel-safety concerns in the continuing high winds; instead, maintenance personnel had the flight crew perform a flight control check by moving the control column throughout its entire range of motion and checking for any abnormal resistance. No abnormalities were detected during this check, and the aircraft was released for flight, but failed to rotate during takeoff when commanded to do so, forcing the flight crew to reject the takeoff at very high speed; the aircraft was safely brought to a stop on the runway.

The BFU's investigation found that the Munich aircraft's left elevator was jammed in a full-TED position, having been forced into that position by the high winds experienced on the ground.  As a result, the BFU recommended, and Boeing instituted, enhanced inspection and maintenance requirements for DC-9s with primarily-tab-driven elevators (the DC-9-10 through -50, MD-80, and Boeing 717) following exposure to ground winds exceeding  without the aircraft's nose pointed into the wind; however, the requirements following exposure to winds below this threshold remained unchanged.

Wind field analysis and load testing of elevator system

As the aircraft had sustained damage despite the ambient wind speeds apparently remaining below the theoretical damage threshold, the NTSB scrutinized the aircraft's parking circumstances to see if there were any factors that could have resulted in the aircraft experiencing local winds of damaging intensity.  A large hangar immediately upwind of the aircraft's parking position was an obvious candidate, and the investigators performed computational fluid dynamics (CFD) modeling of the wind field downwind of the hangar and around the parked aircraft, using a detailed three-dimensional model of the hangar obtained via drone imagery.

The CFD analysis showed that the turbulence produced by the interaction of the wind with the hangar both intensified the local winds affecting the parked aircraft (a  horizontal gust passing over the hangar produced a  gust at the aircraft itself), and also introduced significant vertical components to the wind (the same 55-knot horizontal gust induced a strong updraft at the parked aircraft's tail, immediately followed by a strong downdraft) which could slam the aircraft's elevators forcefully between their TEU and TED mechanical stops, potentially resulting in flight-control damage.

The NTSB performed a series of static and dynamic load tests to determine the effects on the MD-80's elevator system of winds of various strengths, both alone and combined with the additional loads produced by slamming the elevator to the full-TED position from the neutral or full-TEU position.  The accident aircraft's undamaged horizontal stabilizers and left elevator were mounted in a test rig, with the aerodynamic loads on the elevator being simulated by means of hanging weights of various sizes from it; for the dynamic testing, the elevator was lifted to the neutral or full-TEU position using a forklift and then allowed to fall freely to the full-TED position.  Static load testing at simulated wind speeds of up to  did not result in the elevator's geared-tab linkages becoming locked overcenter, but the inboard geared-tab linkage of the test elevator did become locked overcenter, and jam the elevator, during dynamic load testing at simulated wind speeds of 60 knots and greater.

As a final test, with the inboard geared-tab linkage of the test elevator locked in an overcenter position, a TEU force was applied to the elevator using the forklift.  The overcentered links failed and bent outboard, in the same manner as the damage observed on the inboard geared-tab linkage of the accident aircraft's right elevator.

Probable cause

The NTSB released their final report on 14 February 2019, which concluded that

The report praised the actions of the flight crew for contributing to the lack of serious injuries or fatalities in the accident.  In a press release on 7 March, NTSB chairman Robert Sumwalt stated "This is the kind of extreme scenario that most pilots never encounter – discovering that their plane won't fly only after they know they won't be able to stop it on the available runway.  These two pilots did everything right after things started to go very wrong."

Postaccident corrective actions

As a result of the load-test results which showed that wind gusts below the DC-9's design limit could, in some cases, produce dynamic effects sufficient to jam the elevator system, Boeing developed a modification involving the addition of a secondary mechanical stop to the DC-9 elevator system (which would physically prevent the elevator from moving far enough past its limits to allow the geared-tab linkages to become locked in an overcenter configuration); for DC-9s with tab-driven elevators not yet equipped with the secondary elevator stop (encompassing all unmodified classic DC-9s, MD-80s, and 717s), the maintenance manual was revised to decrease the wind strengths which would necessitate a physical inspection of the elevator system before further flight.  The NTSB recommended that Boeing finalize and fully implement these changes, and also develop a means for DC-9 flight crews to detect an elevator jam before attempting to take off.

See also

2021 Houston MD-87 crash, an MD-80 runway excursion that resulted in the total destruction of the aircraft, under investigation; preliminary reports indicate flight-control damage similar to that found on Flight 9363

Notes

References

External links

 NTSB accident report (summary, PDF)
 NTSB investigation docket (archive)
 Accident description at the Aviation Safety Network (archive)

Aviation accidents and incidents in 2017
Aviation accidents and incidents in Michigan
Airliner accidents and incidents caused by mechanical failure
Airliner accidents and incidents involving runway overruns
Aviation accidents and incidents involving sports teams
Accidents and incidents involving the McDonnell Douglas MD-83
2017 in Michigan